Stephen L. Woodcock is a New Hampshire politician.

Career
On November 6, 2018, Woodcock was elected to the New Hampshire House of Representatives where he represents the Carroll 2 district. Woodcock assumed office on December 5, 2018. Woodcock is a Democrat.

Personal life
Woodcock resides in Center Conway, New Hampshire. Woodcock is married and has one child.

References

Living people
People from Conway, New Hampshire
Democratic Party members of the New Hampshire House of Representatives
21st-century American politicians
Year of birth missing (living people)